Caterina Jarboro (July 24, 1898 – August 13, 1986) was an American opera singer. She was the first female black opera singer to sing with a major company, twenty-two years before Marian Anderson's début at the Metropolitan Opera.

Biography
Jarboro was born in 1898 as Katherine (Katie) Lee Yarborough in Wilmington, North Carolina. Her father John was African-American and her mother Annie was Native-American. She had at least four siblings and was raised Catholic (baptized at St Thomas Church in her hometown).

Jarboro studied in North Carolina and then in New York. She sang in the theater musical Shuffle Along and in James P. Johnson's Running Wild. In 1930 she debuted in opera with Verdi's Aida at the Puccini Theatre in Milan, Italy.

In 1933, twenty-two years before Marian Anderson's début at the Metropolitan Opera, impresario Alfredo Salmaggi hired Jarboro to sing with his opera company at the New York Hippodrome. She was presented in the title role of Verdi's Aida.

Later she appeared with the company as Sélika in Meyerbeer's L'Africaine. She was the first female black opera singer ever to perform a leading role with an otherwise all-white company in America (baritone Jules Bledsoe had sung Amonasro with the Cleveland Stadium Opera in 1932). This milestone earned Salmaggi special recognition from First Lady Eleanor Roosevelt. Many other opera appearances throughout Europe followed.

She returned to the United States in 1941. Among her performances were a recitals at the Town Hall in 1942 and Carnegie Hall in 1944. The New York Metropolitan Opera Association invited her to become a member, but when they realized she was not Italian, but Afro-Indian, they denied her membership. After a lengthy and successful career she declined membership when a second invitation was extended. She retired in 1955.

Jarboro died on August 13, 1986 in Manhattan. She is believed to have been 88 years old. Her siblings alive at her time of death were Joseph Yarborough of Philadelphia, and Anna Gayle of Palmetto, Florida.

References

Further reading
Eileen Southern, The Music of Black Americans: A History. W. W. Norton & Company; 3rd edition. 

1898 births
1986 deaths
20th-century African-American women singers
20th-century American women opera singers
African-American women opera singers
People from Wilmington, North Carolina
Singers from North Carolina
American operatic sopranos
Age controversies
African-American Catholics